Philip or Phil Spencer may refer to:

 Philip Spencer (sailor) (1823–1842), US Navy midshipman executed for mutiny without a court-martial
 Phil Spencer (television personality) (born 1969), British television presenter and journalist
 Phil Spencer (business executive), currently head of Microsoft's Xbox division
 Philip Spencer (MP), Member of Parliament for Lincolnshire in 1397